TMCC may refer to:

 Tainan Municipal Cultural Center, a cultural center in Tainan, Taiwan
 Timbergrove Manor Civic Club of Timbergrove Manor, Houston
 Trainmaster Command Control, an electronic control system for model trains
 Truckee Meadows Community College